is a former Japanese football player.

Playing career
Yamamichi was born in Nagoya on May 11, 1980. He joined J1 League club Nagoya Grampus Eight from youth team in 1999. However he could not play at all in the match until 2000. In 2001, he moved to J2 League club Sagan Tosu. He played many matches as center back. In 2006, he moved to Regional Leagues club Banditonce Kobe. He played as regular player in 2 seasons. He retired end of 2007 season.

Club statistics

References

External links

1980 births
Living people
Association football people from Aichi Prefecture
Japanese footballers
J1 League players
J2 League players
Nagoya Grampus players
Sagan Tosu players
Association football defenders